Bikers Welcome Ladies Drink Free is the only album from Ministry's front man Al Jourgensen's side project Buck Satan and the 666 Shooters. It was released in 2011. Jourgensen calls the musical style Country-core / heavy Western and mixes fiddles, banjos, harmonicas, and drum machines with comical lyrics performed by his alias, Buck Satan. The record was released through Jourgensen's label 13th Planet Records.

Track listing

Personnel

Buck Satan and the 666 Shooters 
Buck Satan – vocals, lyrics, acoustic guitar, mandolin, banjo, harmonica, pedal steel guitar, keyboards, production, mixing
Mike Scaccia – lead guitar, electric guitar, acoustic guitar, banjo, resonator guitar
Rick Nielsen – lead guitar, electric guitar
Tony Campos – bass
JoBird –– fiddle
Margaret Lejeune – cello
Sammy D’Ambruoso – drum programming, engineer

Satan's Helpers 
Andrew Davidson – engineer, drum programming on "What's Wrong With Me"
Barry Kooda – baritone vox on "I Hate Every Bone In Your Body Except Mine"
Dave Barnett – stand up bass on "Cheap Wine, Cheap Ramen"

References 

Albums produced by Al Jourgensen
2012 albums